Discherodontus halei is a species of cyprinid fish from Southeast Asia. It appears to have a disjunct range; it is known from Pahang River in western Peninsular Malaysia and from the Tapi River in southern Thailand, as well as from the northern Chao Phraya River basin (Mae Ping and Mae Khlong), Thailand. This species can reach a length of  TL.

References

Cyprinid fish of Asia
Freshwater fish of Malaysia
Fish of Thailand
Fish described in 1904
Taxa named by Georg Duncker
Taxonomy articles created by Polbot